Desmond "Des" Kitchings (born July 19, 1978) is an American football coach and former wide receiver who is currently the offensive coordinator for the Virginia Cavaliers.

Playing career 
Kitchings played as a receiver/return specialist at Furman University. He averaged 29.3 yards per kick return and set a school record of four kick returns for touchdowns. Kitchings was selected by the Kansas City Chiefs in the 2000 NFL Draft, but never played in the pro leagues.

Coaching career 
Kitchings began his coaching career at Furman, working as the tight ends coach and special teams coordinator from 2004 to 2007. He then spent 3 seasons coaching at Vanderbilt serving one of them as the offensive coordinator. After spending 2011 at Air Force, he went on to coach 8 seasons at NC State. In 2020 he served as the running backs coach for South Carolina. In 2021 he was named the running backs coach for the Atlanta Falcons. After week 17 of Kitching's first year with the Falcons, it was announced that he would become the offensive coordinator for the Virginia Cavaliers.

Personal life
Kitchings and his wife, Heather, have three children all whose names begin with the letter A.

References

1978 births
Living people
Players of American football from Columbia, South Carolina
African-American players of American football
American football wide receivers
Furman Paladins football players
Kansas City Chiefs players
New York Jets players
Indianapolis Colts players
St. Louis Rams players
Coaches of American football from South Carolina
African-American coaches of American football
Furman Paladins football coaches
Vanderbilt Commodores football coaches
Air Force Falcons football coaches
NC State Wolfpack football coaches
South Carolina Gamecocks football coaches
Atlanta Falcons coaches
Virginia Cavaliers football coaches
20th-century African-American sportspeople
21st-century African-American sportspeople